Kamil Sylwestrzak (born 16 July 1988) is a Polish professional footballer who plays as a left back for Korona Kielce II.

Club career
On 26 April 2013, he made his Ekstraklasa debut for Korona Kielce in a match against Pogoń Szczecin.

On 25 September 2020, he joined KP Starogard Gdański.

References

External links 
 
 

1988 births
People from Słubice
Sportspeople from Lubusz Voivodeship
Living people
Polish footballers
Association football defenders
Polonia Słubice players
Mieszko Gniezno players
Chrobry Głogów players
Chojniczanka Chojnice players
Korona Kielce players
Wisła Płock players
Ekstraklasa players
I liga players
II liga players
III liga players